Edward Alexander Sanneman (22 June 1902 – 17 March 1989) was an Australian rules footballer who played with St Kilda in the Victorian Football League (VFL).

Notes

External links 

1902 births
1989 deaths
Australian rules footballers from Victoria (Australia)
St Kilda Football Club players
South Bendigo Football Club players